Leslie Wead Russell (April 15, 1840 – February 3, 1903) was an American lawyer and politician.

Life
Russell was the son of Assemblyman John Leslie Russell (1805–1861) and Mary Sybil (Wead) Russell (ca. 1812–1870). He was educated at Canton Academy, and at age 16 began to teach school. Then he studied law at Albany, New York and Milwaukee, Wisconsin. He was admitted to the bar in 1861, and commenced practice in Canton, NY. On October 19, 1864, he married Harriet Jane Lawrence (1843–1931), and they had six children two of whom died in infancy.

Russell was a delegate to the New York State Constitutional Convention of 1867. In 1869, he was elected District Attorney of St. Lawrence County, and County Judge in 1877. He was New York Attorney General from 1882 to 1883, elected at the New York state election, 1881. Afterwards he resumed the practice of law at New York City.

Russell was a delegate to the 1884 and 1900 Republican National Conventions. He was a member of the 52nd United States Congress and served until September 11, 1891, when he resigned to become a justice of the New York State Supreme Court. He resigned from the bench on October 1, 1902.

Russell was buried at the Evergreen Cemetery in Canton, N.Y.

State Senator Charles H. Russell (1845–1912) was his first cousin. Rev. Samuel Russell (1660–1731) was his great-great-great-grandfather.

Sources

TO RUN FOR CONGRESS in NYT on July 30, 1890
RUSSELL'S CHANCES IMPROVED in NYT on August 16, 1890
LESLIE W. RUSSELL NOMINATED in NYT on August 14, 1891
AFTER RUSSELL'S PLACE.; NEW COMPLICATIONS IN THE TWENTY-SECOND DISTRICT. in NYT on August 15, 1891
Leslie W. Russell, Justice of the Supreme Court, Fourth Judicial District in NYT on May 16, 1897
JUSTICE RUSSELL RESIGNS in NYT on October 3, 1902
EX-JUSTICE RUSSELL DEAD in NYT on February 4, 1903
Bio and genealogy transcribed from Genealogical and Family History of Northern New York by William Richard Cutter, at New York Roots
MEMORIAL OF LESLIE W. RUSSELL Annual Reports and Charter, Constitution, By-laws, Names of Officers, Committees, Members, Etc., Etc., (Association of the Bar of the City of New York, 1905), pp 148–150.

External links
 

1840 births
1903 deaths
New York Supreme Court Justices
New York State Attorneys General
People from Canton, New York
Republican Party members of the United States House of Representatives from New York (state)
19th-century American politicians
19th-century American judges